Hugpong ng Pagbabago (HNP) is a regional political party and former political alliance in the Philippines. Formed in 2018 by Sara Duterte, the party was established in support of President Rodrigo Duterte's administration, and was the administration electoral alliance for the 2019 Philippine general election.

In the 2022 Philippine presidential election, the party supported the candidacies of Bongbong Marcos and Sara Duterte for the Philippine presidency and vice presidency, respectively, under the UniTeam Alliance.

History 

The party was formally launched on February 23, 2018 by Sara Duterte and four governors from the Davao Region. In addition to the party's alignment with the Duterte administration, Sara Duterte said that she formed Hugpong ng Pagbabago "to pursue the ideals of what we all want, a strong region, a secure life for our constituents, good governance and effective leadership of the members of the party." The Commission on Elections (COMELEC) granted the accreditation of Hugpong ng Pagbabago as a regional political party in July 2018. A proposal to turn the party into a national party was shelved by Duterte in January 2019.

In preparation for the 2019 elections, HNP held its first political rally on February 12, 2019. HNP partnered with the parties of PDP–Laban, Nacionalista, Lakas–CMD, Pwersa ng Masang Pilipino, Nationalist People's Coalition, Laban ng Demokratikong Pilipino, National Unity Party, and the People's Reform Party, and formed a senatorial slate consisting of 13 candidates for the 2019 senatorial race. Although HNP was allied with the Duterte administration, President Duterte stated that he would not personally endorse the HNP's slate; he later endorsed all of HNP's candidates, except for senators Bong Revilla and Jinggoy Estrada. 9 out of the 13 candidates under Hugpong ng Pagbabago won a seat in the Senate.

For the 2022 Philippine general election, the HNP formed a coalition with three political parties under the UniTeam Alliance, supporting Bongbong Marcos' 2022 presidential campaign. The party also renewed its alliances with the National Unity Party and the People's Reform Party.

Current officials 

 Chairperson: Sara Duterte, Vice President of the Philippines
 Secretary-General: Anthony G. del Rosario, Former Governor, Davao del Norte
 Treasurer: Jayvee Tyron Uy, Vice Governor, Davao de Oro

Candidates for the 2019 Philippine general elections

Senatorial slate

Electoral performance

Presidential and vice presidential elections

Legislative elections

Notes

See also 

Coalition for Change (Philippines)
Hugpong sa Tawong Lungsod
UniTeam Alliance
Lakas–CMD

References 

Local political parties in the Philippines
Political parties established in 2018
2018 establishments in the Philippines
Politics of Davao City
Presidency of Rodrigo Duterte
Regionalist parties
Regionalist parties in the Philippines